Sekolah Berprestasi Tinggi or High Performance School is a prestigious title conferred to a group of schools in Malaysia that have ethos, character and a unique identity to excel in all aspects of education. The schools have a tradition of high culture and excellent work with the national human capital and continuing to grow holistically and are competitive in the international arena. The title is given by Malaysian Ministry of Education (MOE). This is a section of a part of the National Key Result Areas of Government Transformation Programme (GTP).

Background
Desire to identify and create Sekolah Berprestasi Tinggi (SBT) has been announced by the Prime Minister, Dato Seri Najib Bin Tun Abdul Razak in his speech at the National Assembly administration members, civil servants and government-linked companies (GLCs) at the Putrajaya International Convention Centre (PICC) on 27 July 2009. This is as a section in one of the six main part in NKRA which is ″Improving Student Outcome".

"As a pilot project, a total of 100 schools, consisting of ordinary types, schools, cluster schools and boarding schools. With this, we will provide an environment conducive to teaching and learning and promote cooperation between the public and private sector to drive the achievement of students. All these plans will be implemented within three years before the end of 2012."

MOE has prepared an action plan to identify 100 SBT by 2012. This effort is in line with the "1Malaysia: People First, Performance Now". On 9 September 2009, MOE decided to recognize 100 schools consisting of government schools and government-aided schools to be set up as SBT and a SBT Sector Management Division of Residential School and Cluster School (BPSBPSK) so that management of SBT can be implemented efficiently.

A total of 20 schools have been announced as SBT Cohort 1 by Deputy Prime Minister and the Minister of Education, Tan Sri Muhyiddin Yassin on 25 January 2010. The recognition ceremony was held at SMK Aminuddin Baki, Kuala Lumpur on 29 January 2010. On 18 February 2011, a total of 23 schools was announced as SBT Cohort 2 at Sarawak. Another 9 schools were elevated to SBT on 25 May 2011. On 4 February 2012, another 14 schools recognized as SBT Cohort 3 in a recognition ceremony in Putrajaya. On 28 December 2012, 25 schools were given SBT status. After almost 2 years, the fifth cohort consisting of 13 schools were announced, bringing the total to 128. RM27.8mil had been allocated for the schools to enhance their quality of education. The government has agree to continue the project from 2013 to 2015 with the target of 10 SBTs each year with at least one SBT in each state.

Rational
Rational appreciation and give recognition to the school HPS is to:
 Lifting Best Quality Schools: Improving the quality of school performance through increased levels of autonomy to enable schools to implement innovation in education (e.g., organizational management, instructional management, curriculum management, financial management and human resource management).
 Producing Outstanding Students: Produce outstanding students of international caliber to further their education in educational institutions in the world and become superior personalities in all fields of endeavor.
 Bridging the Gap Between Schools in System: Inspire other schools to develop excellence to high levels through bench marking, mentoring and networking with HPS.

Selection
Selection of schools for SBT recognition were conducted by the Selection Committee of SBT, chaired by the Director General of Education (DG) and staffed by the Deputy Director of Education (TKPPM), Operations Sector Education Sector Policy and Development TKPPM Education, Teaching Professionalism TKPPM Sector Development, Director Boarding Schools Management Division and the School of Excellence (BPSBPSK) and the Secretariat of the National Key Result Areas (NKRA). The selection criteria are announced to all schools through MOE portal.

SBT candidate for recognition consists of primary and secondary schools which are in Band 1 based on a composite score that takes into account the Grade Point Average (GPS) and Decision Self Rating School (SMEs) based on Malaysian Education Quality Standard (SQEM).

HPS selection through three screenings:
 First Screening: School is in a band (1), the primary school got a composite score of at least 85 percent (%), and secondary school got a composite score of at least 90 percent (%) Recognition Nomination Form must fill HPS (BPP-SBT). Composite score is a 70% average grade school (GPS) and 30% of Malaysian Education Quality Standard (SQEM). Schools will be listed according to the composite score and scores in BPP-SBT.
 Second Screening: OER will select the eligible school from the band of (1) to be evaluated and verified using SQEM instruments and Annex-SBT by the Inspectorate and Quality Assurance (JNJK). Annex-HPS will evaluate five characteristics of school excellence and superiority of eminent personalities, awards received, networking, networking and bench marking.
 Third screening: Schools that have been verified by JNJK sorted by rating scores SQEM and Annex-SBT. Only schools that receive a score of at least 90% in ratings SKPM have been verified by JNJK be taken into account. The selection committee will choose the school that is recognized as eligible for High Performance Schools.

Honorarium
HPS schools received recognition given special provisions, incentives and training for leaders, teachers and support staff members (AKS). The management of the school are given autonomy in curriculum management, financial management, human resources management and selection of students based on their performance.

Criticism
The award were criticised as it only select the nation top school at current time and abandoned the other premier, historical schools.Victoria Institution, St. John's Institution, Penang Free School, Malacca High School, St. Michael's Institution, Sekolah Tuanku Abdul Rahman , St. Xavier's Institution and Bukit Mertajam High School were left behind during the announcing of 20 pioneer schools of SBT. Lee Wei Lian, Malaysian Insider journalist in his article "The tragic tale of Malaysia education" said,

He further added,

Wong Chun Wai, the Group Chief Editor of The Star, in his article "Surprise Exclusion",

Dr. Mohamed Khir Bin Toyo, in his entry in his blog titled "Which is more important, SBT or Kids in the rural area?" questioned with some of the school already enrolled bright students such as Fully Residential School made the list, some students are only "lucky" for them to be in the awarded school. He said some teachers complain as their "ordinary" school budget were being cut down but at the same time, the government splashed RM 700 million for each SBT. He further questioned the priorities of the government of giving more to already establish schools but neglecting to lift up Low Performance School.

Politician, Lim Kit Siang, in his comment after the announcement of the nationals best students and schools for Sijil Pelajaran Malaysia 2009, said, "It is a slap for SBT's as only two of the nationals best students hails from SBT and only three schools from SBT's made up to the list in nationals best schools" .The others (8 out of 10 students and 7 out of 10 schools) is non-SBT's.

Teachers and Association leaders from Sabah and Sarawak criticised as the initial list do not contain any schools from either states.

Parents from SJK(C) Pei Hwa Pedas, Rembau on 17 February 2010, in their complain of the school did not have enough Islamic Education teachers, said "There is no use of producing SBT's if lack of educators is still a problem in our education."

First cohort
20 pioneer schools were selected on 25 January 2010.

Fully Residential Schools
 Sekolah Tun Fatimah (STF), Johor Bahru
 Sekolah Dato' Abdul Razak (SDAR), Seremban
 Malay College Kuala Kangsar (MCKK), Perak
 Sekolah Menengah Sains Tun Syed Sheh Shahabudin (Tun Syed), Pulau Pinang
 Sekolah Seri Puteri, (SSP) Cyberjaya
 Sekolah Menengah Sultan Abdul Halim, Kedah
 Kolej Tunku Kurshiah (TKC), Seremban
 Kolej Islam Sultan Alam Shah (KISAS), Klang
 Sekolah Menengah Sains Tuanku Syed Putra (SYEDPUTRA), Perlis
 Sekolah Sultan Alam Shah (SAS), Putrajaya
 Sekolah Menengah Sains Muzaffar Syah  (MOZAC), Malacca
 Sekolah Menengah Sains Alam Shah (ASiS), Kuala Lumpur

National Secondary Schools
 Sekolah Menengah Kebangsaan Aminuddin Baki, Kuala Lumpur
 Sekolah Menengah Kebangsaan Sultanah Asma, Kedah
 Sekolah Menengah Kebangsaan (P) St George, Penang
 Sekolah Menengah Kebangsaan (P) Sri Aman, Petaling Jaya
 Kolej Sultan Abdul Hamid, Alor Setar, Kedah

National Primary Schools
 Sekolah Kebangsaan Seri Bintang Utara Kuala Lumpur
 Sekolah Kebangsaan Zainab (2) Kota Baharu, Kelantan
 Sekolah Kebangsaan Taman Tun Dr ismail, Kuala Lumpur
 Sekolah Convent Kota Taiping, Perak
 Sekolah Kebangsaan Bukit Damansara Kuala Lumpur

Second Cohort
23 schools were conferred this title on 18 February 2011.

Government-funded Religious School
 Sekolah Menengah Imtiaz, Terengganu

National Secondary School
 Sekolah Menengah Kebangsaan Laki-Laki Methodist, Kuala Lumpur

Fully Residential Schools
 Sekolah Menengah Sains Muar (SAMURA), Johor
 Sekolah Tuanku Abdul Rahman (STAR), Perak
 Sekolah Berasrama Penuh Integrasi Gombak (INTEGOMB), Selangor
 Sekolah Berasrama Penuh Integrasi Kubang Pasu(iKups), Kedah 
 Sekolah Berasrama Penuh Integrasi Tun Abdul Razak(InSTAR), Pahang
 Sekolah Menengah Sains Alam Shah (ASiS), Kuala Lumpur
 SMS Tengku Muhammad Faris Petra (FARIS PETRA), Kelantan
 Sekolah Menengah Sains Miri, Sarawak
 Sekolah Menengah Sains Seri Puteri (SESERI), Kuala Lumpur
 Sekolah Menengah Sains Selangor, Kuala Lumpur
 Sekolah Menengah Sains Tengku Abdullah, Pahang

National Primary Schools
 Sekolah Kebangsaan (SK) Ulu Lubai, Sarawak

 SK Convent Muar, Johor
 SK Seri Biram, Pahang
 SK Sultan Ahmad Tajuddin, Kedah
 SK Setiawangsa, Kuala Lumpur
 SK (Perempuan) Methodist Kuantan, Pahang
 SK Sultan Ismail, Terengganu
 SK Jalan Tiga, Selangor

National-type Premier Schools
 SJK(C) Perempuan China, Pulau Pinang
 SJK(C) Lick Hung, Selangor.

Another nine schools were chosen in SBT Cohort 2 on 25 May 2011.

Fully Residential School
 Sekolah Menengah Sains Tuanku Munawir (SASER), Seremban
 Sekolah Menengah Sains Sabah (SMESH), Kota Kinabalu
 Sekolah Menengah Sains Kuching (SAINSKU), Sarawak.
 Sekolah Menengah Agama Persekutuan Labu (SMAP LABU), Negeri Sembilan
 Sekolah Menengah Sains Kuala Selangor (KUSESS), Kuala Selangor
 Sekolah Menengah Sains Tengku Abdullah (SEMESTA), Pahang

National Secondary School
 Sekolah Menengah Kebangsaan Lembah Bidong, Kuala Terengganu

Religious School
 Sekolah Menengah Kebangsaan Agama Naim Lil Banat, Kota Bharu

National Premier School
 Sekolah Kebangsaan Seksyen 9, Shah Alam

National-type Premier School
 Sekolah Jenis Kebangsaan Cina Tung Hua, Sibu

Third Cohort
14 schools elevated to SBT on 2 February 2012.

Fully Residential Schools
 Science Girls Seremban , Seremban
 Sekolah Menengah Sains Johor
 Sekolah Menengah Sains Kota Tinggi (SAKTI), Johor
 Sekolah Menengah Sains Sultan Mohamad Jiwa,  Kedah
 Sekolah Menengah Sains Tuanku Jaafar (STJ), Negeri Sembilan

National Premier School

1. Sekolah Kebangsaan (SK) Infant Jesus, Malacca.

2. SK (P) Sultan Ibrahim

3. SK Ibrahim

4. SK Minden Heights, Penang

5. SK Sultan Sulaiman 1

6. SK Tengku Mahmud, Terengganu

7. SK Wellesley, Penang

8. SK Assunta Convent, Pahang

National-type Premier School

1.SJKC Foon Yew 2, Johor

2.SJKC Keat Hwa (H)

3.SJKC Kwang Hwa, Penang.

Fourth Cohort
Another 25 schools were conferred on 28 December 2012.

Fully Residential School
 Sekolah Menengah Sains Sultan Mahmud, Terengganu
 Sekolah Menengah Sains Kepala Batas, Penang
 Sekolah Menengah Sains Pokok Sena, Kedah
 Sekolah Sains Sultan Haji Ahmad Shah, Pahang
 Sekolah Menengah Sains Hulu Selangor (SEMAHSUR), Selangor
 Sekolah Menengah Sains Labuan, Labuan
 Sekolah Berasrama Penuh Integrasi Batu Rakit (BRAINS), Terengganu
 Sekolah Berasrama Penuh Integrasi Selandar, Malacca
 Sekolah Berasrama Penuh Integrasi Kuantan

National Secondary School
 SMK Sultan Ismail, Johor
 SMK Infant Jesus Convent, Johor

Government-funded Religious School
 SM Imtiaz Kuala Terengganu

National Premier School
 SK Tengku Ampuan Intan, Terengganu
 SK Zainab 1, Kelantan
 SK Bertam Indah, Penang
 SK Sultanah Asma, Kedah
 SMK Jalan Empat
 SK Convent Infant Jesus 2, Malacca
 SK Bandar Penawar 2, Johor 
 SK Seri Gaya, Sabah
 SK (P) Methodist 2, Malacca
 SK Bandar Maharani, Johor
 SRK Seri Indera, Perlis

National-type Premier School
 SJK(C) Ave Maria Convent, Perak
 SJK(C) Yok Bin, Malacca
 SJK(C) Union, Penang

On 18 September 2013, 24 school were elevated as SBT.

Fully Residential School
 Sekolah Menengah Sains Kubang Pasu (KUPSIS)
 Sekolah Menengah Sains Machang (SMACH)
 Sekolah Berasrama Penuh Integrasi Jempol (INTEJ)
 Sekolah Menengah Sains Raja Tun Azlan Shah (SERATAS)
 Sekolah Berasrama Penuh Integrasi Gopeng (I-GOP)
 Sekolah Menengah Agama Persekutuan Kajang (SMAPK)
 Sekolah Berasrama Penuh Integrasi Rawang (SEPINTAR)

National Secondary School
 Sekolah Menengah Kebangsaan Dato' Penggawa Barat, Pontian, Johor

Religious School
 Sekolah Menengah Kebangsaan Agama (SMKA) Sharifah Rodziah
 SMKA Al Irshad

National Premier School
 SK Tengku Mariam
 SK Convent of the Infant Jesus 1 (M)
 SK Convent
 SK Sultan Idris II
 SK Marian Convent
 SK Batu Lanchang
 SK Taman Megah
 SK Bukit Jelutong
 SK Sri Petaling
 SK Putrajaya Presint 11 (1)

National-type Premier School
 SJK (T) Ladang Rem
 SJK(C) Han Chiang
 SJK (C) Kuen Cheng 2

Fifth Cohort
On 30 October 2014, 13 schools were granted this title.

Fully Residential School
 Sekolah Menengah Sains Rembau, Rembau, Negeri Sembilan
 Sekolah Menengah Sains Tun Syed Sheh Shahabudin, Bukit Mertajam, Penang

National Secondary School
 Sekolah Menengah Kebangsaan Bukit Jambul, Gelugor, Penang
 Sekolah Menengah Kebangsaan Abdul Rahman Talib, Kuantan, Pahang

National Primary School
 SK Air Merah, Kedah
 SK Seri Wakaf Baharu, Kelantan
 SK Kubang Kerian 3, Kelantan
 SK St. Thomas, Pahang
 SK Lingga Baru, Sabah
 SK Saujana Impian, Selangor
 SK Kampong Raja, Terengganu
 SK Putrajaya Presint 9 (2), Putrajaya.

National-type Primary School
 SJKT Ringlet, Pahang

Sixth Cohort
On 18 Mac 2016, 6 schools were granted this title.

Fully Residential School
 Sekolah Menengah Sains Lahad Datu, Lahad Datu, Sabah.
 Sekolah Menengah Sains Tapah, Tapah, Perak

National Primary School
 SK Father Barre's Convent (M), Kedah.
 SK Raja Muda (Integrasi), Selangor.
 SK King George V, Negeri Sembilan.
 SK Putrajaya Presint 18 (1), Putrajaya.

See also 
 Government Transformation Programme (Malaysia)
 Education in Malaysia
 Sekolah Berasrama Penuh
 Cluster School

References

External links
 http://bpsbpsk.webs.com Official website of SBT
 https://web.archive.org/web/20101127051951/http://nkra.moe.gov.my/ Official website of MOE NKRA
 https://web.archive.org/web/20130730083755/http://www.pemandu.gov.my/GTP/default.aspx Official website of GTP

 
Education policy in Malaysia
Schools in Malaysia
Secondary schools in Malaysia